Mark Edward Fusco (born March 12, 1961) is an American former professional ice hockey player who appeared in 80 National Hockey League (NHL) regular season games for the Hartford Whalers in 1984–85. As an amateur, Fusco won the Hobey Baker Award in 1983 while playing for the Harvard Crimson men's ice hockey team.  That season he set the school record for points by a Harvard defenseman in one season, which stood until it was surpassed by Adam Fox in 2019. 

Fusco played hockey for the United States at the 1984 Winter Olympics. Fusco also represented the U.S. in the 1984 Canada Cup and 1985 Ice Hockey World Championship tournaments before retiring from professional hockey. Fusco was inducted into the United States Hockey Hall of Fame in 2002, and was named a recipient of the 2009 NCAA Silver Anniversary Award.

After attending Harvard Business School, Fusco became a successful entrepreneur in new software development businesses. From 2005 to 2013, Fusco was Chief Executive Officer and President of Aspen Technology Inc.

His younger brother Scott is also a hockey player of note.

Awards and honors

Career statistics

Regular season and playoffs

International

References

External links
 

1961 births
American men's ice hockey defensemen
Hartford Whalers players
Harvard Crimson men's ice hockey players
People from Burlington, Massachusetts
Sportspeople from Middlesex County, Massachusetts
Ice hockey players at the 1984 Winter Olympics
Olympic ice hockey players of the United States
Living people
Undrafted National Hockey League players
United States Hockey Hall of Fame inductees
Hobey Baker Award winners
Ice hockey players from Massachusetts
Belmont Hill School alumni
AHCA Division I men's ice hockey All-Americans
Harvard Business School alumni